American singer Usher has released eight studio albums, ten compilation albums, eight extended plays, and 80 singles (including 19 as a featured artist). His music has been released on the LaFace, Arista, Jive and RCA record labels. Usher has sold more than 23 million albums in the United States alone and over 65 million albums worldwide. With over 100 million total records sold worldwide, he is one of the best selling music artists of all time. He has nine Billboard Hot 100 number-one singles (all as a lead artist) and 18 Hot 100 top-ten singles. In 1994, Usher released his self-titled debut album in North America, producing three singles that had moderate chart success, and the album sold more than 500,000 copies. His follow-up 1997 album My Way sold over 8 million copies worldwide, becoming his breakthrough album. It was certified six-times platinum in the US, and spawned three successful singles, including his first UK number-one "You Make Me Wanna..." and first US Hot 100 number-one song "Nice & Slow". Usher's success continued in 2001 with his third studio album 8701. It debuted at number four on the Billboard 200. The album produced two number-one singles—"U Remind Me" and "U Got It Bad". In 2002, the album was certified four-times platinum in the US for sales of 4 million copies. Its worldwide sales stand at over 8 million.

Usher's success increased in 2004, with the release of his fourth studio album Confessions. It was his first US number-one album, and had the highest first-week sales for an R&B artist, with 1.1 million copies sold. It spawned four Hot 100 number-one hits; "Yeah!", "Burn", "Confessions Part II", and "My Boo". "Yeah!" and "Burn" stayed atop the Hot 100 for a combined 20 weeks and were the best-selling singles of 2004, ranking first and second, respectively. Confessions received a diamond certification from the Recording Industry Association of America (RIAA), and has sold over 15 million copies worldwide. The album ranked second on the 2000–2009 Billboard 200 Decade-end chart. In 2008, Usher issued Here I Stand. Its lead single "Love in This Club" topped the Hot 100, marking Usher's eighth number-one on the chart. Follow-up single "Love in This Club Part II" became a top 20 hit, while the album's fourth and fifth singles, "Trading Places" and "Moving Mountains", charted below the top 40. Here I Stand was deemed as a commercial failure relative to Confessions, which had sold nineteen million copies worldwide compared to Here I Stand's five million during the same period. It was certified platinum by the RIAA and has sold over 2 million copies in the United States. Its worldwide sales stand over 6 million copies.

In 2010, Usher released Raymond v. Raymond, and it became his third consecutive number-one album. The album produced five singles: "Papers", "Hey Daddy", "Lil Freak" and "There Goes My Baby" all reaching the Hot 100's top 40, while "Papers" and "There Goes My Baby" topped the Hot R&B/Hip-Hop Songs chart. The album's two other singles, "OMG" and "More", achieved worldwide success, with "OMG" topping the Hot 100 to give him his ninth number-one single. Raymond v. Raymond was certified platinum by the RIAA, and sold 1.3 million copies in the US. By the end of the year, it sold over 2 million copies worldwide. In the same year, a follow-up set entitled Versus was released, and became Usher's sixth top ten album. The EP's lead single "DJ Got Us Fallin' in Love" reached the top ten in many countries and peaked at #3 on the Billboard Hot 100. Usher's seventh studio album Looking 4 Myself was released in June 2012 and became his fourth number-one album in the US. Its first single "Climax" peaked in the top twenty on the Hot 100, and topped the Hot R&B/Hip-Hop Songs chart for eleven weeks. The song also won him a Grammy at the 55th Grammy Awards for Best R&B Performance. The album's second single "Scream" reached the top ten in various countries, including the US, Canada and the UK. In 2014, Usher released "Good Kisser", "She Came to Give It to You" and  "I Don't Mind" as successes in the UK, with the latter reaching the top 15 of the Hot 100 and topping the Hot R&B/Hip-Hop Songs to give him his 13th number-one on that chart, tying him with Michael Jackson and Marvin Gaye.

Usher released his eighth studio album Hard II Love in 2016, which went on to become his seventh top-five album on the Billboard 200. It was led by the Hot 100 top-40 hit "No Limit" and Australian top-ten hit "Crash". In 2018, Usher collaborated with Zaytoven to release his first collaborative album entitled A. It debuted and peaked at number 31 on the Billboard 200 chart, with the song "Peace Sign" released as the only single.

Albums

Studio albums

Collaborative albums

Compilation albums

Live albums

Extended plays

Singles

As lead artist

As featured artist

Promotional singles

Other charted songs

Other appearances

See also
Usher videography

Notes

References

External links
 Official website
 Discography of Usher at AllMusic

Discographies of American artists
Rhythm and blues discographies
Discography